Pelli Pandiri  ( Wedding Pandal) is a 1997 Telugu-language drama film directed by Kodi Ramakrishna. It stars Jagapati Babu, Raasi, Pruthvi with music composed by Vandemataram Srinivas. It was produced by G. Aswartha Narayana Babu, M. C. Shekar and S. Ramesh Babu under the SRS Art Movies banner. Pelli Pandiri is a remake of the Kannada film Anuraga Sangama (1995), which was inspired by the Charlie Chaplin-starrer City Lights (1931).

Plot
Prakash is the stubborn son of tycoon Notla Raghunath Chowdary. He befriends Govind, who performs and sells Ektara outside his school without any social barriers. One day, Raghunath Chowdary causes an accident in which Govind's mother dies, leaving him alone. Prakash takes Govind in, even though it means going against his parents' wishes. As the years go by, their friendship grows stronger, but Prakash's parents still hold a grudge against Govind. Later, Prakash moves abroad and Raghunath Chowdary conspires to get rid of Govind. Feeling betrayed, Govind quits and takes shelter with an old watchman in a group of apartments where he becomes an assistant to the residents. 

During this time, he meets and falls in love with a blind girl named Kasthuri. Kasthuri's alcoholic father dies in an accident, and Govind becomes her guardian. He decides to help Kasthuri regain her sight and contacts a famous eye specialist, Dr. Prabhavathi, who assures them of success but at an expensive cost. Meanwhile, Bhadram, the secretary of the apartments, is being hounded by his nephew, Goldman, who wants to steal his wealth. Govind takes a loan from Bhadram to pay for Kasthuri's surgery. Upon his return, Bhadram accuses Govind of stealing his wealth and frames him for robbery, leading to Govind's imprisonment.

While in jail, Govind befriends Jailor Rama Rao, Prabhavathi's divorced husband, and tries to reunite the couple. In the meantime, Prakash returns and angers his parents by supporting Govind. He falls in love with Kasthuri and convinces his parents to accept the match. Kasthuri initially refuses his proposal, but eventually accepts it after Prakash attempts suicide and with the help of Prabhavathi. Goldman proves Govind innocent, and he is acquitted. Circumstantially, Govind meets Prakash, who is happy to hear about his impending marriage but is surprised to see Kasthuri as the bride.

At the wedding, Kasthuri recognizes Govind's voice and confronts him. He tells her that he cares for her, but he does not love her. Prakash asks Govind to swear on him whether he has any feelings for Kasthuri, and Govind takes an oath that he is willing to sacrifice anything for his friend. In the end, Prakash gives his blessings to Govind and Kasthuri's union, and the movie ends happily.

Cast

 Jagapati Babu as Govind
 Raasi as Kasthuri
 Pruthvi as Prakash
 Sarath Babu as Inspector Rama Rao
 Suhasini as Dr. Prabhavathi
 Costume Krishna
 Sudhakar as Goldman
 Mallikarjuna Rao as Bhadram
 Raghunatha Reddy as Notla Raghunath Chowdary
 Pokula Narasimha Rao as Watchman
 Garimalla Viswaswara Rao
 Kallu Chidambaram as Photographer
 Mithai Chitti
 Radha Prashanthi
 Tejaswini
 Master Anand Vardhan as Young Prakash
 Master Srinivas as Young Govind

Soundtrack

Music composed by Vandemataram Srinivas. Music is released on Supreme Music Company.

References

External links
 

1998 films
1990s Telugu-language films
Indian romantic drama films
1998 romantic drama films
Indian buddy drama films
Films about women in India
Social realism in film
Films shot in Hyderabad, India
Indian feminist films
Films about Indian weddings
1990s buddy drama films
Films directed by Kodi Ramakrishna
Films set in Hyderabad, India
Telugu remakes of Kannada films